The Polish Culture Society of Edmonton is a society based in Edmonton, Alberta, Canada, supporting the development of Polish culture.

History 
Established in 1971 in Edmonton, Alberta by a group of Polish emigrants, among them was a renowned professor of University of Alberta,  demographer Dr.Karol Józef Krótki.

Mission 
The Society’s main goal is the preservation, promotion and development of Polish culture, Polish language, traditions and customs within a Canadian context.

Chopin 2010 Celebration 
The Polish Culture Society of Edmonton has taken a leadership role working with the Polish Consulate in Alberta in preparation for this global event. Through the society, CHOPIN2010 Celebration Committee was formed to prepare, coordinate, and bring a series of independent Chopin Celebrations to life.

References

External links

Polish diaspora organizations
Polish-Canadian culture
Polish diaspora in Canada